Ramdas Shantaram Kamat (18 February 1931 – 8 January 2022)  was an Indian musician. He worked in Sangeet Natak, Marathi theatre.

Early life
As a child he took Hindustani classical music lessons from elder brother Upendra. Natya Sangeet studied under Pt. Govind Buwa Agni, Pt. Jitendra Abhisheki, Shri. Prabhakar Pendharkar, Shri. Bhalachandra Pendharkar, and Pt. Bhimsen Joshi.

Bhava Geet Gayan studied under Yashwant Deo, Natak Saunstha, The Goa Hindu Association Mumbai, Gopinath Savkar's Kala Mandir, Mumbai Marathi Natya Sangha, Ranga Sharada, Bharat Natya Mandir Pune, Jayaram Shiledar's Marathi Rangabhoomi, and Mohan Wagh's Chandralekha.

He acted under direction of Gopinath Savkar, Mo. Ga. Rangnekar, Master Dattaram, Nandkumar Raote, Bhalachandra Pendharkar & Madhukar Todarmal.

Personal life and death
Kamat died at his home in Vile Parle, a neighbourhood of Mumbai, on 8 January 2022, at age 90.

Performances
Kamat acted in 18 plays in his lifetime listed below.

 Sangeet Saunshay-Kallol
 Sangeet Sadhu ani Ashwinsheth
 Sangeet Sharada
 Sangeet Saubhadra
 Sangeet Maanapaman
 Sangeet Sannyasacha Saunsar
 Sangeet Kanhopatra
 Sangeet Ekach Pyala
 Sangeet Matyagandha
 Sangeet Yayati ani Devayani
 Sangeet Madanachi Manjiri
 Sangeet Hey Bandh Reshmanche
 Sangeet Meera Madhura
 Sangeet Honaji Bala
 Sangeet Swarasmarat
 Sangeet Mandaarmala
 Sangeet Dhanya Te Gayani kala
 Sangeet Saubhadra Sageetika

Awards

 Maharashtra Government Akheel Bharatiya Marathi Natya Parishad's Bal Gandharva Puraskar.
 Pune Chichwad Municipal Corporations Bal Gandharva Puraskar.
 Sangli Nagarpalika's Govin Ballal Deval Puraskar.
 Maharashtra Rajya Sanskritik Puraskar for Upashastriya Sangeet .
 Chhota Gandharva Puraskar at Koregaon.
 Akheel Bharatiya Natya Parishad's Keshavrao Bhole Puraskar.
 Akheel Bharatiya Natya Parishad's Jitendra Abhisheki Puraskar.
 Yashwantrao Prathishthan's Swara Raaj Chhota Gandharva Puraskar.
 Manipal T M A Pai Foundation's outstanding Konkani Puraskar.
 Vishnudas Bhave Puraskar, Sangli.
 President of the Marathi Natya Sammelan, Beed, held on 13, 14 & 15 Feb 2009.
 Parle Bhushan Puraskar 2010.
 90th Marathi Natya Sammelan & First Vishwa Marathi Natya Sammelan held in New Jersey USA.
 Mumbai Swara Sanman Puraskar on the World Music day in 2013.
 Bakhle Buwa's Bharat Gayan Samaj Pune's Pandit Ram Marathe Puraskar.
 Maharashtra Government balwant Pandurang aka Annasaheb Kirloskar Sangeet rangabhoomi Jeevan Gaurav Puraskar in January 2014.
 New Delhi's Sangeet Natak Akademi Award on 23-10-2015.
 Uttung Puraskar Vile Parle Mumbai 03-01-2016.
 Maharashtra Government Saunskrutik Puraskar 2014, received on 31-01-2016.
 Parnekar Maharaj Pratishthan Pune's Puraskar received on 26-03-2016.
 Sahyadri Vahini Natya Ratna Puraskar on 12-05-2016.

References

External Links
 

1931 births
2022 deaths
20th-century Indian male classical singers
Indian male stage actors
Singers from Goa
Recipients of the Sangeet Natak Akademi Award